Boneh-ye Sohrab (also Romanized as Boneh-ye Sohrāb) is a village in Howmeh-ye Gharbi Rural District, in the Central District of Ramhormoz County, Khuzestan Province, Iran. At the 2006 census, its population was 2,006, in 421 families.

References 

Populated places in Ramhormoz County